Vojtěch Tomi (born 26 February 1994) is a Czech ice hockey forward currently playing for HC Vítkovice Ridera of the Czech Extraliga.

References

External links
 

HC Vítkovice players
Czech ice hockey forwards
Sportspeople from Ostrava
1994 births
Living people
HC Baník Sokolov players
AZ Havířov players
HC ZUBR Přerov players
HC Frýdek-Místek players
MKS Cracovia (ice hockey) players
Czech expatriate ice hockey people
Expatriate ice hockey players in Poland
Czech expatriate sportspeople in Poland